Jean Van Buggenhout (15 January 1905 – 1 June 1974) was a Belgian cyclist. He competed in the team pursuit event at the 1928 Summer Olympics.

References

External links
 

1905 births
1974 deaths
Belgian male cyclists
Olympic cyclists of Belgium
Cyclists at the 1928 Summer Olympics
People from Schaerbeek
Cyclists from Brussels